The 2012 Manta Open was a professional tennis tournament played on hard courts. It was the ninth edition of the tournament which was part of the 2012 ATP Challenger Tour. It took place in Manta, Ecuador between 28 July and 5 August 2012.

Singles main-draw entrants

Seeds

 1 Rankings are as of July 23, 2012.

Other entrants
The following players received wildcards into the singles main draw:
  Galo Barrezueta
  Diego Hidalgo
  Roberto Quiroz
  João Souza

The following players received entry from the qualifying draw:
  Iván Endara
  Emilio Gómez
  Yuichi Ito
  Greg Ouellette

Champions

Singles

 Guido Pella def.  Maximiliano Estévez, 6–4, 7–5

Doubles

 Duilio Beretta /  Renzo Olivo def.  Víctor Estrella /  João Souza, 6–3, 6–0

External links
Official Website

Manta Open
Manta Open
Manta Open